Campaign or The Campaign may refer to:

Types of campaigns
 Campaign, in agriculture, the period during which sugar beets are harvested and processed
Advertising campaign, a series of advertisement messages that share a single idea and theme
Blitz campaign, a short, intensive, and focused marketing campaign for a product or business
Civil society campaign, a project intended to mobilize public support in order to instigate social change
Military campaign, large scale, long duration, significant military strategy plans incorporating a series of inter-related military operations or battles
Political campaign, an organized effort which seeks to influence the decision making process within a specific group
Project, an undertaking that is carefully planned to achieve a particular aim
 The period during which a blast furnace is continuously in operation.

Places
Campaign, Tennessee, an unincorporated community in the United States

Arts, entertainment, and media

Films
The Campaign (film), a 2012 film starring Will Ferrell and Zach Galifianakis

Gaming
Campaign (role-playing games), a connected series of battles, adventures or scenarios played by the same character in a role-playing game
Campaign (video game), 1992 computer game by Empire Software
Campaign, a common name for the story mode of a video game

Literature
Campaign (book), a 2011 coffee table book by Shia LaBeouf and Karolyn Pho, with a long-form music video co-directed by Marilyn Manson and Shia LaBeouf
Campaign (magazine), a British magazine serving the advertising industry
 "The Campaign", a poem by Joseph Addison

Music
Campaign (mixtape), commercial digital album by Ty Dolla Sign, 2016
"Campaign" (song), by Ty Dolla Sign, 2016
 The Campaign (Affiance album), 2012
 The Campaign (Into the Moat album), 2009

See also 
 Campaign hat, a broad-brimmed felt or straw hat, with a high crown, pinched symmetrically at the four corners